María Julia Olivan is an Argentine journalist.

Awards

Nominations
 2013 Martín Fierro Awards
 Best female journalist

References

Argentine women journalists
People from Ezeiza, Buenos Aires
Living people
1974 births